The Curie family is a French family with a number of illustrious scientists. Several members were awarded the Nobel Prize, including physics, chemistry, or the Nobel Peace Prize. Pierre Curie, his Polish-born wife Marie Curie, their daughter, Irène, and son-in-law, Frédéric Joliot-Curie, are the most prominent members.

Family genealogy

Paul Curie (1799–1853), physician, humanist.  x Augustine Hofer (1805–1883), a descendant of the famous scholar and mathematician Johann Bernoulli (1667–1748).
 Eugene Curie (1827–1910), doctor.  x Sophie-Claire Depouilly (1832-1897).
 Jacques Curie (1855–1941), physicist.  x Marie Masson (1856–1945).
 Maurice Curie (1888–1975), physicist.
 Daniel Curie (1927-2000), physicist.
 Pierre Curie (1859–1906), physicist, Nobel Prize in 1903.  x Marie Skłodowska Curie (1867–1934), physicist, chemist, Nobel Prize in 1903 and in 1911.
 Irène Joliot-Curie (1897–1956), physicist, Nobel Prize in 1935.  x Frédéric Joliot-Curie (1900–1958), physicist, Nobel Prize in 1935.
 Pierre Joliot-Curie (1932), biologist.  x Anne Gricouroff, biologist, daughter of Georges Gricouroff and Colette Rodet.
 Marc Joliot (1962), neuroscientist.
  Alain Joliot (1964), biologist.
 Hélène Langevin-Joliot (1927), nuclear physicist.  x Michel Langevin (1926–1985), physicist, son of André Langevin and Luce Dubus, grandson of Paul Langevin and Jeanne Desfosses.
 Françoise Langevin-Mijangos x Christian Mijangos.
 Yves Langevin (1951), astrophysicist.
 Ève Curie (1904–2007), writer, journalist, pianist.  x Henry Richardson Labouisse, Jr. (1904–1987), American diplomat, Nobel Peace Prize on behalf of UNICEF in 1965.

See also
 Bernoulli family
 Langevin family

References

Notes
The Curie family won a total of 5 Nobel Prizes. 

 
French families
Medical families
Scientific families